

History 

NEUF architect(e)s is a team of creative professionals who have been contributing to Canada's built environment for nearly 50 years. Active in all sectors, including strategic planning, urban design, institutional, resorts and hotels, residential, interiors, commercial, industrial and office buildings, the firm specializes in finding creative solutions to today's most challenging design problems. With offices in Montreal, Ottawa and Toronto, NEUF architect(e)s has grown into one of the most diversified architecture and design practices in the country.

Over the years, NEUF has completed hundreds of projects, including landmarks such as the CBC Headquarters in Ottawa, Bombardier facilities in Mirabel and Dorval, and many of the towers that define our cities’ skylines, including its key role in the newly completed CHUM super-hospital. Recipient of multiple design awards — including recent wins at the World Architecture Festival in Berlin and Amsterdam — NEUF architect(e)s is currently involved in projects across the Americas, Europe and Asia.

Awards and distinctions

External links
Official website

References 

Architecture firms of Canada
Companies based in Montreal
Canadian companies established in 1971
1971 establishments in Quebec